Nagorny, Nagornyi, Nagornyy or Nahorny (Russian: Нагорный, Ukrainian: Нагорний) is a Slavic masculine surname, its feminine counterpart is Nagornaya. It may refer to
Aleksandr Nagorny (born 1982), Russian football manager and former player
Nikita Nagornyy (born 1997), Russian gymnast
Serhei Nahorny (born 1956), Soviet sprint canoeist 
Vitus Nagorny (born 1978), German football striker 
Yevgeny Nagorny (born 1972), Russian serial killer